Stabbing attacks, which have been used as a terrorist tactic for thousands of years, became an increasingly common form of terrorist attack on random civilians in the 21st century, in particular during the 2010s and 2020s.

Like the vehicle-ramming attacks that increased during the same time period, stabbing attacks are prevalent because attackers can easily obtain knives and other stabbing instruments.

Historically, this form of terrorist tactic is most associated with the Zealots and the Sicarii. Ancient  Jewish terrorist groups that used this form of terror attack against the Romans during the Second Temple period.

Causes propelling the rise of the tactic
According to security analyst Peter Bergen, stabbing attacks have gained popularity because such attacks are inexpensive and easy to carry out, but very difficult for security services to prevent.

Incitement by terrorist groups

In May 2016, Al-Qaeda's Inspire published an article entitled. “O Knife Revolution, Head Toward America.” The magazine urged Muslims to kill “the intelligentsia, economic and influential personalities of America,” by low-tech methods including stabbing attacks on the grounds that such assaults are “easy options that do not require huge efforts or man power, but the result is parallel to the big operations or even more.”

In October 2016, Rumiyah, the online propaganda and recruitment magazine published by the Islamic State of Iraq and the Levant (ISIL) told followers that holy warriors down through Muslim history have “struck the necks of the kuffar” in the name of Allah, with "swords, severing limbs and piercing the fleshy meat of those who opposed Islam.” The magazine advised its readers that knives are easy to obtain, easy to hide, and deadly, and that they make good weapons in places where Muslims might be regarded with suspicion.

Modern History

A wave of lone wolf terrorist stabbing attacks in which Palestinian Arabs attacked Israelis began on 3 October 2015 with the first of the Lions' Gate stabbings.  The ensuing 2015–2016 wave of violence in Israeli-Palestinian conflict is thought to have been driven not by formal organizations but, rather by social media postings inspiring young Palestinians to undertake attacks with knives and with vehicles.  In response, Israeli police have revamped their anti-terrorism tactics, increasing monitoring of social media, improving the intercommunication of mobile devices, and giving security agencies the ability to instantly trace phone calls made from such devices.

The series of Palestinian stabbing attacks were followed by the spread of such attacks during the wave of Islamic terrorism in Europe which had seen "at least" 10 stabbing attacks allegedly motivated by Islamic extremism in Europe by the spring of 2017, with a particular concentration of such attacks in France. A number of cases have also occurred in the United States during this period, including the St. Cloud, Minnesota, mall stabbing and the Ohio State University attack.

List of terrorism-related stabbing attacks

See also
Vehicle-ramming attack
Pressure cooker bomb
Suicide terrorism
Sicarii - Ancient Jewish extremists that first invented this tactic 
Terrorism by method

References

Terrorism tactics